Cyperus turrialbanus is a species of sedge that is native to parts of Central America.

See also 
 List of Cyperus species

References 

turrialbanus
Plants described in 1978
Flora of Costa Rica
Flora of Panama